The Ibex Hills are a mountain range in Inyo County, California.

References 

Mountain ranges of Inyo County, California
Mountain ranges of the Mojave Desert